Hookton is a locality located  south of Fields Landing, at an elevation of   in Humboldt County, California.

Hookton is named for its founder, John Hookton.

References

Former settlements in Humboldt County, California